Kurtiss Riggs is an arena football coach and a former quarterback who is the head coach Sioux Falls Storm. He's been a coach for the Storm since 2002, when he began as the offensive coordinator. He became their head coach in 2003. During his tenure as head coach the team set a professional gridiron football record with 40 consecutive wins, and he's led the team to four undefeated seasons.

Head coaching record

References 

Living people
Sioux Falls Storm
Indoor Football League coaches
Year of birth missing (living people)